The Dave Clark Five Return! is the second US studio album by the English rock band the Dave Clark Five. It features the single "Can't You See That She's Mine" and covers of "Rumble" by Link Wray & His Wray Men, "On Broadway" by The Drifters and the Disney song "Zip-a-Dee-Doo-Dah".

Ten of the twelve tracks were taken from the DC5's first UK album, A Session with The Dave Clark Five. LP was released in both mono (LN 24104) and electronic stereo (BN 26104) version. The album was produced by Adrian Clarke, a pseudonym made up of Dave Clark and engineer Adrian Kerridge name.

Reception

In his AllMusic retrospective review of the release, Bruce Eder wrote, "Aside from the hit 'Can't You See That She's Mine,' and everything is filler, whether the covers of 'Rumble,' 'Zip-a-Dee-Doo-Dah,' and 'On Broadway,' or trite, diddling originals, including a flight into a near-Muzak instrumental ("Theme Without a Name"). Among the originals, 'I Need You, I Love You' and 'Forever and a Day' aren't too bad, but you're best off leaving this in the bin of overpriced collector items in which you'll probably find the record."

Track listing
All tracks written by Dave Clark, Mike Smith, Ron Ryan except where noted.

Side one
"Can't You See That She's Mine" - 2:21
"I Need You, I Love You" - 2:34
"I Love You No More" - 2:19
"Rumble" (Link Wray, Mill Grant) - 2:37
"Funny" (Dave Clark, Denis Payton) - 1:52

Side two
"Zip-a-Dee-Doo-Dah" (Allie Wrubel) - 2:32
"Can I Trust You" (Dave Clark) - 2:06
"Forever and a Day" - 2:10
"Theme Without a Name" (Dave Clark, Lenny Davidson) - 2:03
"On Broadway" (Barry Mann, Cynthia Weil, Jerry Leiber, Mike Stoller) - 2:39

Personnel
The Dave Clark Five
Dave Clark - drums, backing vocals
Mike Smith - keyboards, lead vocals
Lenny Davidson - electric guitars, backing vocals
Rick Huxley - bass guitar, backing vocals
Denis Payton - tenor saxophone,  backing vocals
 Bobby Graham - drums (session drummer, not stated on the record sleeve)

References

The Dave Clark Five albums
1964 debut albums
EMI Columbia Records albums